Cumberland is a surname. Notable people with the surname include:

Frederick William Cumberland (1821–1881), engineer and politician
George Cumberland (1754–1848), art collector and artist
Jarron Cumberland (born 1997), American basketball player
Ken Cumberland (1913–2011), New Zealand geography academic and local-body politician. 
Richard Cumberland (dramatist) (1732–1811), civil servant and dramatist
Richard Cumberland (philosopher) (1631–1718), bishop and philosopher
Thomas Cumberland, English footballer
Vic Cumberland (1877–1927), Australian Rules footballer
Nigel Cumberland (born 1967), Author and leadership coach